North Fork Kings Creek is a  long 3rd order tributary to Kings Creek in Hancock County, West Virginia.

Course
North Fork Kings Creek rises about 0.5 miles northwest of Kendall, Pennsylvania, in Beaver County and then flows southwest into West Virginia to join Kings Creek at Sun Valley, West Virginia.

Watershed
North Fork Kings Creek drains  of area, receives about 38.8 in/year of precipitation, has a wetness index of 316.53, and is about 72% forested.

See also
List of rivers of Pennsylvania
List of Rivers of West Virginia

References

Rivers of Pennsylvania
Rivers of West Virginia
Rivers of Beaver County, Pennsylvania
Rivers of Hancock County, West Virginia